Garnett Thomas Eisele, (November 3, 1923 – November 26, 2017), better known as G. Thomas Eisele, was a United States district judge of the United States District Court for the Eastern District of Arkansas.

Education and career
Born on November 3, 1923, in Hot Springs, Arkansas, Eisele had attended several Republican National Conventions with his grandfather, Martin Eisele.

He was a private in the United States Army during World War II from 1942 to 1946. In 1947, he procured a Bachelor of Arts degree from Washington University in St. Louis, Missouri. He then obtained both a Bachelor of Laws and a Master of Laws in 1950 and 1951, respectively, from Harvard Law School in Cambridge, Massachusetts. 

From 1952 to 1961, Eisele was in the United States Naval Reserve. He was in private practice in Hot Springs from 1951 to 1953. He was an Assistant United States Attorney in the capital city of Little Rock from 1953 to 1955. After he was not nominated for United States Attorney, Eisele returned to private practice in Little Rock from 1956 to 1970.

In the early 1960s, Eisele supported Winthrop Rockefeller's attempt to revive the Arkansas Republican Party. At the time Rockefeller was engaged in an intra-party rivalry with state chairman William L. Spicer of Fort Smith, the owner of a chain of drive-in theaters. From 1966 to 1969, Eisele was the legal advisor to Rockefeller, who was elected governor in 1966–68.

Federal judicial service

Eisele was Rockefeller's choice for the district court position vacated in 1969 by Gordon Elmo Young. Two other Arkansas Republicans had expressed interest in the judgeship, Odell Pollard of Searcy in White County, then the state Republican chairman and the choice of former United States Senate nominee and later Arkansas state party chairman Charles T. Bernard, and state Circuit Judge Henry M. Britt of Hot Springs, the 1960 Republican gubernatorial nominee against Orval Faubus.

Eisele was nominated by President Richard Nixon on January 23, 1970, to a seat on the United States District Court for the Eastern District of Arkansas vacated by Judge Gordon Elmo Young. He was confirmed by the United States Senate on August 5, 1970, and received his commission on August 6, 1970. He served as Chief Judge from 1975 to 1991. He assumed senior status on August 1, 1991. His service terminated on November 26, 2017, due to his death in Little Rock.

See also
 List of United States federal judges by longevity of service

References

External links
 

1923 births
2017 deaths
United States Army personnel of World War II
Arkansas lawyers
Arkansas Republicans
Assistant United States Attorneys
Harvard Law School alumni
Judges of the United States District Court for the Eastern District of Arkansas
People from Hot Springs, Arkansas
Lawyers from Little Rock, Arkansas
United States Army soldiers
United States district court judges appointed by Richard Nixon
United States Navy reservists
Washington University in St. Louis alumni
20th-century American judges